Alfred Rowland (February 9, 1844 – August 2, 1898) was a U.S. Representative from North Carolina.

Born in Lumberton, North Carolina, Rowland attended the common schools in the area. He entered the Confederate States Army in May, 1861 and served as a lieutenant in Company D, Eighteenth Regiment of North Carolina State Troops, until May 12, 1864. He was then imprisoned at Fort Delaware until June 1865. After the war, he studied law and was admitted to the bar in 1867 and commenced practice in Lumberton. Afterwards, he served as a member of the State house of representatives in 1876, 1877, 1880, and 1881. Rowland was elected as a Democrat to the Fiftieth and Fifty-first Congresses (March 4, 1887 – March 3, 1891). However, he was not a candidate for renomination in 1890. After his political career, he resumed the practice of law. He died in Lumberton, North Carolina, August 2, 1898, and was interred in Meadow Brook Cemetery. The town of Rowland was named in his honor.

References

Works cited
 

1844 births
1898 deaths
Confederate States Army officers
Democratic Party members of the North Carolina House of Representatives
Democratic Party members of the United States House of Representatives from North Carolina
People from Lumberton, North Carolina
19th-century American politicians